Ralph Clayton Almas, better known as Red Almas (April 26, 1924 — May 13, 2001), was a Canadian ice hockey goaltender. He played 3 games in the National Hockey League with the Detroit Red Wings and Chicago Black Hawks between 1947 and 1952. The rest of his career, which lasted from 1945 to 1955, was spent in various minor leagues. He wore the jersey number "1".

Career statistics

Regular season and playoffs

Trades
 Traded by Detroit Red Wings (with Barry Sullivan, Lloyd Doran, Tony Licari and Thain Simon) to Chicago Black Hawks for Hec Highton and Joe Lund on September 9, 1948.
 Traded by Chicago (with Guyle Fielder and Steve Hrymnak) to Detroit Red Wings for financial compensation on September 23, 1952.

Awards
 Named to American Hockey League All-Star Second Team, 1948-49.

References

External links
 

1924 births
2001 deaths
Buffalo Bisons (AHL) players
Calgary Stampeders (WHL) players
Canadian ice hockey goaltenders
Chicago Blackhawks players
Detroit Red Wings players
Ice hockey people from Saskatchewan
Indianapolis Capitals players
St. Louis Flyers players
Sportspeople from Saskatoon
Victoria Cougars (1949–1961) players